The Yamaha X-1R is a commuter motorbike built by Yamaha Motors.  It is similar to a Yamaha X-1, but replaces that model's 110 cc engine with a larger 135 cc engine. It is almost exactly similar with the Yamaha Sniper/T135 except for several distinguishable features, such as:

 Body styling & fairings
 Engine & swing arm color (black)
 Headlight assembly
 Instrument panel
 Transmission (1 down, 3 up)
 Movable foot pegs
 Tail light assembly
 Bent side mirrors
 Clip-on handlebars
 Dual piston front disc brakes
 Rear disc brakes
 Kick starter rubber

Specifications

X-1R